Mirów Castle is a castle located in Książ Wielki which currently housing the Wincenty Witos Institution and an Agricultural School. There is a museum in the castle. The castle is located in Książ Wielki, Lesser Poland Voivodeship; in Poland.

The castle was the residence of the House of Myszkowski. It was designed and built in between 1585-1595 by Santi Gucci, by an order of the Bishop of Kraków Piotr Myszkowski. During the first quarter of the eighteenth century, the castle went into the hands of the Wielkopolski family, and was reconstructed in a Baroque style.

The castle is part of a tourist trail and program called the Trail of the Renaissance in Lesser Poland (Szlak Renesansu w Małopolsce, Polish), made by the Association of Justus Ludwik Decjusz.

References

Buildings and structures completed in 1595
Castles in Lesser Poland Voivodeship
Miechów County